Delcídio do Amaral Gomez (born February 2, 1955) is a Brazilian politician. He worked at Shell and was nominated to Petrobras's Internacional Directory by president Fernando Henrique Cardoso where he worked until 2001 when he left Petrobras and start his relation with the Workers'Party . Before his relation with Workers' party, Delcidio indicated a new director to Fernando Henrique Cardoso, Nestor Cervero. He represented Mato Grosso do Sul in the Federal Senate from 2003 to 2016 and before he was removed from office, he was the high-representative of the Workers' Party in the Brazilian Senate. He was the speaker of his party in the Senate and the head of the Senate's economic affairs committee. Amaral was arrested in November 2015 for allegedly taking kickbacks from Petrobras. A Supreme Court judge, Teori Zavascki, said he authorised the arrest after seeing evidence that Amaral had planned the flight of Petrobras's former international director, in return for his silence. Ceveró was convicted of money laundering and sentenced to five years in prison.

On March 16, 2016 Amaral signed a plea bargain alleging involvement of other politicians in corruption scandals in Brazil. On May 10, 2016 the Senate approved by 74 votes in favor, the removal of Mr. Amaral from office for breaching parliamentary decorum.

See also
Petrobras
Operation Car Wash
2016 in Brazil
Odebrecht
List of scandals in Brazil

References

|-

Living people
1955 births
Members of the Federal Senate (Brazil)
Brazilian Labour Party (current) politicians
People from Mato Grosso do Sul